The 1948–49 English National League season was the eighth season of the English National League, the top level ice hockey league in England. Eight teams participated in the league, and the Harringay Racers won the championship.

Regular season

Rosters

Brighton Tigers
Gib Hutchinson, Fish Robertson, Gordie Poirier, Al Truelove, Bill Booth, Bill Rooker, Johnny Oxley, Bobby Lee, Tommy Durling, Lorne Trottier, Lefty Willmot, Casey Stangle, Lee Thorne, Jimmy Chappell, Lennie Baker, Ted Cumming, Harry Vedan.

Earl's Court Rangers
Johnny Bourada, Stan Simon, Arthur Green, Hal Meyer, Willis Mosdell, Joe Farley, Kenny Campbell, Henry Hayes, Abbie Hodkinson, Kenny Booth, Walt Sullivan, Stan DeQuoy, Harold Young, Alf Harvey, Rocky Rothwell.

Harringay Greyhounds
Tommy Donachey, Bill Allan, Gunnar Telkkinen, Ted Hallam, Duke Macdonald, Ken Kennedy, Ed Blondin, Alf Menchini, Johnny Gauthier, Wyn Cook, Ross Planch, Gaston Gauthier, Freddie Dunkleman, Terry McGibbon.

Harringay Racers
Lorne Lussier, Duke Campbell, Danny Linton, Pat Coburn, Joe Shack, Bill Glennie, Pete Payette, Ricky Ricard, Ronnie Lay, George Steele, Toby Defalco, Erwin Duncan, Edwin Duncan.

Nottingham Panthers
Dick Halverson, Jim Herriot, Kenny Westman, Roger Goodman, Bill Allen, Archie Stinchcombe, Chick Zamick, Ed Young, Wally Black, Paul Theriault, Hal Brown, Larry McKay, Maurice Laforge.

Streatham
Monty Reynolds, Harold Smith, Art Hodgins, Bob Brodrick, Paddy Ryan, Doug Wilson, George Drysdale, Bud McEachern, Johnny Costigan, Jimmy Campbell, Johnny Sergnese, George Baillie, Red Stapleford, Vic Niemi, Dave Miller, Norm Gustavsen.

Wembley Lions
Wilf McCluskey, Vic Shettler, Frank Orlando, Vic Berke, Earl Mollard, Gerry Rowse, Eric Fleet, Toddy Thurston, Don Stay, Stan Petrow, Mal Davidson, Vern Smith, Johnny Pyryhora, Stan Obodiac, Don Mann, Goldie Goldstrand, Bert Oig.

Wembley Monarchs
Stubby Mason, Sonny Rost, Red Kurz, Don Thomson, Roy Thompson, Marvin Thomson, George Beach, Freddie Sutherland, Mac McLachlan, Kid Kauppi, Jean-Paul Lafortune, Les Anning, Frank Trottier.

External links
 Nottingham Panthers history site

Eng
Engl
Engl
English National League seasons
1948–49 in British ice hockey